The MInisterial NEtwoRk for Valorising Activities in digitisation, or MINERVA, is a European Union organisation concerned with the digitisation of cultural and scientific content for creating an agreed European common platform, recommendations and guidelines about digitisation, metadata, long-term accessibility and preservation.

External links
MINERVA

European Union agencies' subsidiary organisations